Darmaran may refer to:
Darmaran-e Olya
Darmaran-e Sofla